Dieter Josef Ilg (born September 30, 1961 in Offenburg) is a German jazz double-bassist.

He worked early in his career with Joe Viera in the early 1980s, then with Randy Brecker, the WDR Big Band, Bennie Wallace, Albert Mangelsdorff, Wolfgang Dauner, Charlie Mariano, Marc Copland, Jeff Hirshfield, Wolfgang Muthspiel and others. He has taught at Rockschool Freiburg and the Freiburg Conservatory.

Discography

As leader
 Ilg/Schroder/Haffner (Mood, 1989)
 Summerhill (Lipstick, 1991)
 Fieldwork (Jazzline, 1998)
 Live (Fullfat, 2001)
 Bass (Fullfat, 2008)
 Otello (Fullfat, 2010)
 Otello Live at Schloss Elmau (ACT, 2011)
 Parsifal (ACT, 2013)
 Mein Beethoven (ACT, 2015)
 B-A-C-H (ACT, 2017)
 Nightfall with Till Bronner (Masterworks, 2018)

With Marc Copland
 Tracks (Bellaphon, 1992)
 Two Way Street (Jazzline, 1993)
 What's Goin' On (Jazzline, 1994)

With Charlie Mariano
 A La Carte (Fullfat, 2009)
 Due (Fullfat, 2009)
 Goodbye Pork Pie Hat (Sommelier Du Son, 2009)

References

German jazz double-bassists
Male double-bassists
1961 births
Living people
21st-century double-bassists
21st-century German male musicians
German male jazz musicians
ACT Music artists
Okeh Records artists